Sankyns Green is a  hamlet within the civil parish of Shrawley in Worcestershire, England.

Villages in Worcestershire
Hamlets in Worcestershire